Rovering in Victoria is part of Scouting in Victoria and is predominantly the Rover section of Scouts Australia in Victoria, Australia, which is run by the Victorian Branch Rover Scout Council. At the 2012 Census, there were 1033 registered Rover Scouts in Victoria, in roughly 100 Rover Crews.

Rover Scouts is the fifth and final section of Scouting in Australia, and began in 1918. Rovers are aged between 18 and 26 years of age and are organised into local Crews, which are associated with a Scout Group. Rover Scout Crews accept anyone interested in taking up Rovering, whether or not they have been in Scouts before. The section is based on Baden-Powell's book Rovering to Success and the theme of knighthood. Rover Scouts are actively encouraged to become better citizens through taking part in Scouts Australia's nationally accredited training programs, developing leadership skills, participating in outdoor activities, attending, both as participants and staff, at national and international events, providing service to the community and generally building their life skills.

Rover Scouts are distinguished from other sections of Scouting and leaders by a red panel on the blue uniform shirt across the arms and shoulders, with green "epaulette" badges on each shoulder, and the 'shoulder knot' of five ribbons (tan for Joeys, yellow for Cubs, green for Scouts, maroon for Venturers and red for Rover Scouts) on the left shoulder, symbolising the role of the Rover Section in helping and protecting their younger brothers and sisters.

The Victorian Rover Scouts kick-started recreational skiing's popularity in Australia, at a time where they would often have to hike up the mountains after making their own skis; this was heavily influenced by W. F. Waters, the first Branch Commissioner for Rover Scouts in Victoria.

Branch Organisation
There are eight Region Rover Scout Communities in Victoria and these Communities are responsible for the management and distribution of important information to Rover Scout Crews in their respective regions. They report to the statewide Branch Rover Council and Elect the Office Bearers of the Branch Rover Scout Council each May for the next financial year. the Communities are also elect/appoint the subcommittees for Victorian Rover Scouts assets and annual events.

Rover Scout Motorsport
Rover Scout Motorsport (RSM) is a subcommittee of the Branch Rover Council and oversees all Rover Motorsport events in Victoria, ensuring that they follow the strict speed, safety, alcohol and racing policies of the Confederation of Australian Motorsport. Rover Motorsport was briefly stopped for three years in the early 2000s when insurance was lost. It is the continued affiliation with CAMS that allows Rovers to continue racing. They were congratulated by the then Minister for Sport and Recreation, James Merlino, for their road safety programme targeted to scouts at the Australian Scout Jamboree in 2007.

Rover Assets

Mafeking Rover Park

Mafeking Rover Park is a campground which is fully owned and operated by the Victorian Branch Rover Council and was originally anticipated as a home for Victorian Rover Scout Motorsport. Located 32 km from Yea, it is a 130 Hectares mix of open land and scrub.

Although it is called a Rover Park, its use is open to all sections of the Scouting Movement, and any others who wish to hire it.

Mafeking was named after the South African town of Mafeking, which was besieged for 219 days during the Second Boer War. The Garrison was commanded by Scouting Founder Lt General Lord Sir Robert Baden-Powell of Gilwell, who with 2,000 British soldiers held off 8,000 Boer Soldiers until relieved, catapulting Baden-Powell to the status of a national hero.

Mafeking's facilities include a 4-cargo-container-tall abseiling tower, commando, orienteering and 9-hole golf courses. Lake Surfmoot provides an area for canoeing, and there are numerous walking tracks. Accommodation is offered in the Troop Hall, Bunkhouses and on standard campsites. Mafeking also has numerous motorsport related facilities with well maintained tracks that are set up in compliance with the requirements of the Confederation of Australian Motorsport.

Mafeking is home to a large variety of Australian fauna and flora, such as kangaroos, koalas, swap wallabies, possums, bats, as well as a multitude of lizards, frogs, birds and fish. Local indigenous plants are used at mafeking, both from propagated species collected from the local area, and through revegetation efforts.

Alpine Rovering
Alpine Rovering in Victoria takes place mainly in the W.F. Waters Lodge at Mt Baw Baw and the Bogong Rover Chalet, home to the Alpine Rover Crew and now also the Alpine Venturer Unit.

The Alpine Rover Crew was formed in 1940 by W.F. "Bill" Waters, Branch Commissioner - Rovers during 1930 - 1965, to promote the Bogong Rover Chalet. All invested Rover or Leaders, who have completed a Bogong Winter Party, become a member during their first winter party. The Alpine Venturer Unit was formed in 2000, mostly by the hard work of Matt & Ian Franzke. It is used as many Venturers visit the chalet but cannot be invested into a Rover Crew.

Before 1940 and the birth of the Alpine Rover Crew, the Bogong Rover Crew carried out the same purpose. However, since then, membership has become an award for services to Alpine Rovering. Members have displayed the of Rovering and are dedicated in their service to others. Roughly 200 members have since been invested, in a ceremony on skis that traditionally takes place at "Investiture Point" the closest place to the Chalet you can see Mount Bogong, where the ashes of W.F. Waters were scattered.

Bogong Rover Chalet was one of the first ski lodges on the Bogong High Plains which is why it is so far from the village of Falls Creek. Similarly, the WF Waters Lodge is the closest to the carpark at Mount Baw Baw Village.

Major Events

Mudbash
Mudbash is an annual motorsport event run by the Rovers. The four-day event is held over the Queens Birthday weekend in June each year, and is now held at Mafeking Rover Park in Caveat, in country Victoria. Each year it is attended by more than 1500 people.

Competitors at Mudbash build vehicles, known as buggies, to conform to CAMS regulations. These vehicles range from modified road cars to custom built dune buggies.

Endeavor Rover Crew organised the first Mudbash in 1972, which was held at the Big River campsite in Marysville, and was attended by 5 vehicles. In the years since, the event has boomed and has been attended by more than 70 vehicles in some years.

Notable events at Mudbash include the Obstacle Course, Hill climb (now known as Quafftumbla challenge) and Motorkhana, which takes place in the main arena at night.

Surfmoot
Surfmoot is an annual camp run over the Australia Day weekend in January, and is held at Eumerella Scout Camp in Anglesea.

One of Victorian Rovers longest running events, Surfmoot started in 1931 when a group of Geelong Rovers invited a number of Melbourne crews to Angleasea for a surfing camp. Eumerella Scout Camp has played host to the event every year since 1953, except for three years when the Ash Wednesday Bushfires caused the event to be moved to Bay Park and then Phillip Island. Prior to being held at Eumerella, it was held at the Geelong District Campsite and also on the Anglesea Foreshore.

Activities at Surfmoot include a waterslide, Super Tub racing as well as many others. Night entertainment often includes bands, djs and themed parties. There are also off site activities run in the surrounding areas.

MARB
The Metropolitan Area Rover Ball, or MARB, is an annual fancy dress Rover ball run by a committee of Rovers. It is normally held on a Saturday night in September. The organising committee is composed of members from one of the Metropolitan regions, and rotates each year.

Surrey Thomas Rover Crew

The Surrey-Thomas Rover Crew now Surrey Thomas Rover Crew (STR) is best known for its role in the development of the sport of rogaining. The Rover Scout crew was formed in 1971 in Brighton, Australia. Soon after forming, the crew undertook to run an annual twenty-four-hour cross-country navigation event. At the first Surrey-Thomas twenty-four-hour rogaine in 1972, forty starters, mostly from scouting, set off from Gembrook and circled the base camp at Basan's Corner via a series of loops along forest roads. True cross-country navigation was minimal, but the publicity from the event and the emphasis placed on quality base camp service and a friendly atmosphere was sufficiently popular that there was a demand for similar events over the next two years. These were followed by an important shift to an all cross-country score event set at Yea in 1975, the first such event in the world catering for the general public. The word rogaining is derived from the names of three of the founders, Rod Phillips, Gail Davis (née Phillips) and Neil Phillips (RoGaiNe, hence 'rogaining', 'rogainer' etc.) who were all members of the Rover Crew. The name was formally adopted by the Victorian Rogaining Association at its inaugural annual general meeting in August 1976 and accepted by Scouts Australia and University bushwalking groups to give the new sport an identity in its own right.
The crew is still functioning today.

References

See also

Scouting and Guiding in Victoria

Scouting and Guiding in Australia